A tosher is someone who scavenges in the sewers, a sewer-hunter, especially in London during the Victorian era. The word tosher was also used to describe the thieves who stripped valuable copper from the hulls of ships moored along the Thames. The related slang term "tosh" referred to valuables thus collected. Both "tosher" and "tosh" are of unknown origin.

In fiction
A tosher in Victorian London is the profession of the title character in Dodger, a 2012 novel by Terry Pratchett.

The character Murky John is a Tosher in Year of the Rabbit Series 1 Episode 2.

See also

, someone who scavenges in river mud.

References

External links

Toshers in fiction : "Joe Rat", a novel by Mark Barratt
Toshers and mudlarks in "The Horrid Jobs Quiz"
"Dodger" a novel by Terry Pratchett

Obsolete occupations
Waste collection
Sewerage